A knit cap is a piece of knitted headwear designed to provide warmth in cold weather. It usually has a simple tapered shape, although more elaborate variants exist. Historically made of wool, it is now often made of synthetic fibers.

Found all over the world where the climate demands warm clothing, knit caps are known by a variety of local names.

Construction

Most knit caps are tapered at the top. The stretch of the knitting itself hugs the head, keeping the cap secure. They are sometimes topped with a pom-pom or loose tassels. Knit caps may have a folded brim, or none, and may be worn tightly fitting the head or loose on top. A South American tradition from the Andes Mountains is for the cap to have ear flaps, with strings for tying under the chin. A special type of cap called a balaclava folds down over the head with openings for just the face or for the eyes or mouth only.

Some modern variants are constructed as a parallel sided tube, with a draw-string closure at one end. This version can be worn as a neck-warmer with the draw-string loose and open, or as a hat with the draw-string pulled tight and closed.

Other names and history 

Dating from the 15th century, the earliest type of knitted wool cap was produced in the Welsh town of Monmouth.

The earliest surviving example of a "Monmouth cap" is held by Monmouth Museum and was knitted from coarse 2 ply wool. The cap was made by casting on at the lower edge and knitting in the round towards the top. The crown consists of a classic rounded top, with the last remaining stitches cast off. The yarn tail was wrapped around just below the castoff stitches to gather them, leaving the little lump commonly, but inexactly, referred to as a button. The doubled brim was formed by picking up stitches inside the body of the cap, and worked down to the original cast on. The cast on loops were picked up, and a 3 needle bind-off worked to finish and join the inner brim to the outer cap, ending with a little loop.

Each hat was made weatherproof by felting, a process which reduced its size. The distance from the centre to the hem in this example varies between 5 and 6 inches (150 mm).
Thousands of Monmouth caps were made, but their relatively low cost, and the ease with which the knitting could unravel, means that few remain.

Historically, the wool knit cap was an extremely common form of headgear for seamen, fishers, hunters and others spending their working day outdoors from the 18th century and forward, and is still commonly used for this purpose in the northern regions of North America, Europe, Asia, and other cold regions of the world.

Being found all over the world where climate demands a warm hat, the knit cap can be found under a multitude of local names. In parts of the English-speaking world, this type of knitted hat is traditionally called a beanie. However, in parts of Canada and the US, the word 'beanie' can additionally be used to denote a different design of brimless cap, which is floppy and made up of joined panels of felt, twill, or other tightly woven cloth rather than being knitted.

A knitted cap with ear flaps is often called a bobble hat, toboggan, or sherpa. The term  is also sometimes used for knitted caps in Southern American English.

Members of the United States military commonly refer to a knitted cap as a watch cap, as it is the headgear worn while "standing watch" on a ship or guard post. The term snookie cap is also frequently used in the US military.
In Western Pennsylvania English (Pittsburghese), it is known as a tossle cap. It may also simply be called a winter hat.

Other names for knitted caps include woolly hat (British English) or wool hat (American English); sock hat, knit hat, poof ball hat, bonnet, sock cap, stocking cap, skullcap, ski hat, sugan, or chook.

Balaclava 

The pull-down knit cap that goes from the crown over the ears and around the neck, with a hole for the face, was known in the army of the British Empire as an Uhlan cap or Templar cap. During the Crimean War, handmade pull-down caps were sent to the British troops to help protect them from the bitterly cold weather before or after the Battle of Balaclava. The cap became popularly known a Balaclava helmet or just balaclava among the soldiers.

Scandinavian tophue 

In Scandinavia, caps resembling a typical knit cap with a pom-pom have been in use since the Viking period and possibly earlier. The terms tophue (Danish), topplue (Norwegian), toppluva (Swedish) mean 'top cap', and refer to the pom-pom.

The Viking-age Rällinge statuette, possibly a depiction of the god Freyr, wears what might be a pointed cap with pom-pom.

Early caps were probably sewn or made with nålebinding, but were knitted from the 17th century onwards, when knitting became known in Scandinavia. Inspired by the phrygian cap of the French revolution, it became largely ubiquitous during the 18th and 19th century. It is still found in many of the Scandinavian folk costumes for men.

Canadian toque, touque or tuque 

In Canadian English, knit caps are more commonly known as a tuque (pronounced ; also spelled  or ). A proper Canadian tuque has a pom pom on top  but there are variations. It is considered cold-weather outerwear and is not commonly worn indoors. Toque is also commonly used across New England as well, especially among the working class. In Michigan's Upper Peninsula, it is called a chook or chuke.

The term tuque is French Canadian. It is widely known in Québecois culture as can be seen with it's usage in La guerre des tuques. 

Some etymologists think it probably comes from an Old Spanish word (toca) for a type of headdress — specifically, a soft, close-fitting cap worn about 500 years ago.

Toque is the spelling we use for some other types of headwear. But these are rarely mentioned in news stories. Toques include conical or plumed hats from previous centuries, the tall white crowns worn by chefs, and modern snug hats that fall into the rather vague category of high-fashion.

The French toque is an alternate spelling from Middle Breton, the language spoken by Breton immigrants at the founding of New France. In Old Breton, it was spelled toc; in Modern Breton, it is spelled tok, meaning simply 'hat'.

The Canadian term likely has its origins with the long hats that were worn by the Voyageurs as they traversed westward on the rivers of North America. The term was picked up among the Blackfeet from them and entered Chinook Jargon all the way to the Pacific and the Klondike.  

In the 12th and 13th centuries, women wore embroidered "toques", made of velvet, satin, or taffeta, on top of their head-veils. In the late 16th century, brimless, black velvet toques were popular with men and women. Throughout the 19th century, women wore toques, often small, trimmed with fur, lace, bows, flowers, or leaves.

The tuque is similar to the Phrygian cap, and, as such, a red tuque during the 1837 Patriotes Rebellion became a symbol of French-Canadian nationalism. The symbol was revived briefly by the Front de libération du Québec (FLQ) in the 1960s. Despite this, the tuque is also considered a symbol of Canadian identity broadly due to its ubiquity among English and French Canadians alike. It is also notable for having been the headwear of SCTV's Bob and Doug McKenzie.

The word is also occasionally spelled touque and, although this is not considered a standard spelling by the Canadian Oxford Dictionary, some informal media polls have suggested that it is the preferred spelling by many Canadians.
In some sections of Canada, a tuque with a brim on it, commonly worn by snowboarders, is nicknamed a bruque (a brimmed tuque).

British bobble hat 

In England, a knit cap may be known as a bobble hat, whether or not it has a yarn "bobble" or pom-pom on top.

Bobble hats were traditionally considered utilitarian cold-weather wear. In the early 21st century they were considered popular only with geeks and nerds. A surprise rise in popularity, driven initially by the Geek-Chic trend, saw them become a fashionable and with a real fur bobble, luxury designer item.

In the late 20th century, in the United Kingdom, they (like the anorak) were associated with utilitarian un-fashionability or with older football supporters, as they had been popular in club colours during the 1960s and 1970s. Along with the pin-on rosette and the football scarf, the bobble hat was seen as traditional or old-fashioned British working-class football regalia.

In popular culture 

Knitted caps are common in cold climates, and are worn worldwide in various forms. They have become the common headgear for stereotypical dockworkers and sailors in movies and television. Bill Murray wore this type of hat in The Life Aquatic with Steve Zissou, possibly as a parody of the red tuque (or Phrygian cap) worn by French oceanographer Jacques Cousteau.

Michael Nesmith of The Monkees also wore a knitted cap in his television series, as did Jay in the films of the View Askewniverse, Robert Clothier's character "Relic" in the long-running Canadian TV series The Beachcombers, and Hanna-Barbera's character Loopy de Loop wore a knit cap as well. Michael Parks wore one as James "Jim" Bronson in the popular series Then Came Bronson. Robert Conrad also had worn one in his role of coureur des bois in the epic TV series Centennial. Bruce Weitz's character Mick Belker wore this hat throughout almost every episode of Hill Street Blues.

Everest from the series PAW Patrol wears a teal knit cap with white trimmings that she is rarely seen without.

Characters in the animated series South Park, including Eric Cartman and Stan Marsh, usually wear knitted caps. Jayne Cobb from the TV series Firefly wore an orange sherpa knitted and sent to him by his mother in the episode "The Message". The character Compo on the British TV show Last of the Summer Wine is almost always seen wearing a knitted cap.

Edd from Ed, Edd n Eddy wears a black, loose knit cap almost every time he's on screen, which covers something on his head that he's embarrassed about.

The guitarist for the Irish band U2, The Edge, is also known for wearing a knitted cap while performing, or during interviews. Tom Delonge, former guitarist and vocalist of the pop punk band Blink-182 is also known to wear a knitted cap during live performances. Rob Caggiano, music producer and former guitarist for thrash metal band Anthrax, is often seen wearing a black one. Lee Hartney from The Smith Street Band is regularly seen in a black knit cap, even during an Australian summer. Canadian Daniel Powter also wore a blue knitted cap during the music video for "Bad Day". Knitted caps are also worn commonly by hip hop artists. Masao Inaba from Revelations: Persona wears one.

Santa Claus is often shown with a knitted cap or a sewn cap following the typical Scandinavian-style knitted cap with a pom-pom, a trait he has inherited from the Germanic/Scandinavian tradition. The Scandinavian tomte is likewise usually depicted with a red knitted cap, such a cap is also used as a national symbol (sometimes negatively) in Norway.

Famous instances of tuques (the Canadian knitted cap) in pop culture include:

 the SCTV characters Bob and Doug McKenzie, whose signature outfits included a tuque.
 Bonhomme Carnaval, the mascot of the Quebec Winter Carnival wears the traditional red tuque and Ceinture fléchée of the province's original French settlers. 
 Toronto Maple Leafs goalie Jonathan Bernier, who wore a toque over his helmet during the 6th annual National Hockey League Winter Classic on January 1, 2014.
 The 1984 Québécois film La guerre des tuques (The War of the Tuques), which is about an enormous snowball fight.
 Jacques Plante, the Hall of Fame goaltender for the Montreal Canadiens ice hockey team throughout the 1950s, was one of the more notable wearers of the tuque.
 José Théodore, another Canadiens goaltender, wore a tuque on top of his goalie mask during the 2003 Heritage Classic game (which was played at temperatures below ).
 La Tuque, a town in Quebec named after a nearby hill that resembles a tuque.

See also 
 Animal hat
 Balaclava (clothing)
 Barretina
 Beanie (seamed cap)
 Bonnet (headgear)
 Cap
 Chullo
 Do-rag
 Monmouth cap
 Phrygian cap
 Pussyhat

Explanatory notes

References

External links 
 
 
 

18th-century fashion
19th-century fashion
20th-century fashion
21st-century fashion
American fashion
Canadian culture
Canadian fashion
Caps
Winter clothes
Fur trade
Maritime culture
Canadiana